Jorge Buenahora (born 29 April 1950) is a Uruguayan rower. He competed in the men's coxed pair event at the 1972 Summer Olympics.

References

1950 births
Living people
Uruguayan male rowers
Olympic rowers of Uruguay
Rowers at the 1972 Summer Olympics
Place of birth missing (living people)
Pan American Games medalists in rowing
Pan American Games bronze medalists for Uruguay
Rowers at the 1971 Pan American Games
20th-century Uruguayan people